Syntemna is a genus of flies belonging to the family Mycetophilidae.

The species of this genus are found in Eurasia and Northern America.

Species:
 Loewiella asinduloides Meunier, 1904 
 Loewiella brevitarsis Meunier, 1923

References

Mycetophilidae